A Killer's Confession is an American alternative metal band from Cleveland, Ohio formed in 2016. The band consist of vocalist Waylon Reavis, drummer Morgan Bauer, bassist JP Cross and guitarist Tommy Church.

In September 2016, Waylon Reavis announced on Facebook that his new project, A Killer's Confession, had signed a deal with EMP Label Group who would release their debut album Unbroken in Spring 2017. The album was partially recorded and mixed at Kentucky's Third Sky Studio with Reavis, and co-Producers Thom Hazaert, Richard Easterling, Jon Dale, and Matt Trumpy. On Halloween 2016 AKC released their debut single "A Killer's Confession", featuring a guest performance by Korn guitarist Brian "Head" Welch. The band, including guitarists Matt Trumpy and Paul Elliott, and drummer Jon Dale, played their first shows in December 2016, with Dead By Wednesday, culminating in a hometown show at the Cleveland Agora on December 17.

Current 
In 2019, A Killer's Confession signed with Chicago/Miami-based record label, WakeUp! Music Group after self-releasing Angel on the Outside and Reanimated.  On October 18, 2019, the Wake Up! Music Group released A Killer's Confession second full-length album entitled The Indifference of Good Men.

History 
In September 2016, Reavis announced his new project, A Killer's Confession, had signed to Megadeth bassist David Ellefson's EMP Label Group, and that their debut album UNBROKEN would be released in 2017.

Band members 

Current members
 Waylon Reavis – vocals, programming (2016–present)
 JP Cross – bass (2017–present)
 Shawn Iannazzo – guitars (2021–present)
 Lee Hutt - drums (2022-present)

Former members
 Morgan Bauer – Drums (2018–2022)
 Paul Elliot – guitars (2016–2017)
 Jon Dale – drums (2016–2018), bass (2016–2017)
 Matthew Trumpy – guitars, programming (2016–2018)
 Rocky Sobon – guitars (2018)
 Matthew Tarach – guitars (2018)
 Mark Alexander – guitars (2018)
 Thomas Church – guitars (2019–2021)

Timeline

Discography 

 2017 – Unbroken
 2019 – The Indifference Of Good Men
 2021 – Remember

Singles 

 "Angel on the Outside" (Digital Single) (2017 AKC Global LLC)
 "I Wish" (Digital Single) (2017 AKC Global LLC)
 "Reanimated" (Digital Single) (2018 AKC Global LLC)
 "Numb" (Digital Single) (2019 Wake Up! Music Rocks)
 "Last Chance" (Digital Single) (2020 Wake Up! Music Rocks)
 "Remember" (Digital Single) (2021 Wake Up! Music Rocks) – No. 33 Mainstream Rock Songs
 "Light to Darkness" (Digital Single) (2021 Wake Up! Music Rocks)
 "Trapped Inside" (Digital Single) (2021 Wake Up! Music Rocks)
 "Between Your Eyes" (Digital Single) (2021 Wake Up! Music Rocks)
 "Knife From Behind" (Digital Single) (2021 Wake Up! Music Rocks)
 "Tell Your Soul" Feat. Chad Gray (Digital Single) (2021 Wake Up! Music Rocks) 
 "A Better Time" (Digital Single) (2022 Wake Up! Music Rocks)
 "The Boys" Featuring Matthew Trumpy & Jon Dale (Digital Single) (2022 Wake Up! Music Rocks)
 "Be My Witness"  (Digital Single) (2022 Wake Up! Music Rocks)

Awards 

Stone Chrome Radio Listener's Choice Awards

|-
| 2016 || A Killer's Confession || Breakout Band of the year || 

Rock Rage Radio Awards

|-
| 2017 || Unbroken ||  Album of the Year || 
|-
| 2017 || Rebirth || Video of the Year || 
|-
| 2017 || Angel on the Outside ||  Song of the year || 
|-
| 2017 || Waylon Reavis || Male Singer of the year ||
|-
| 2017 || JP Cross || Bass Player of the year ||
|-
| 2017 || Matt Trumpy || Guitarist of the year ||
|-
| 2017  || Jon Dale || Drummer of the year ||

External links

References 

Heavy metal musical groups from Ohio